Castle of Doom may refer to:

 Vampyr, a 1932 French-German horror film directed by Carl Theodor Dreyer
 Castle of Doom Studios, a recording studio in Glasgow, Scotland